Xennials are the micro-generation of people on the cusp of the Generation X and Millennial demographic cohorts. Many researchers and popular media use birth years from 1977 to 1983, though some extend this to include those born up to 1985. Xennials are described as having had an analog childhood and digital young adulthood. 

In 2020, Xennial was added to the Oxford Dictionary of English. It was added to the Oxford English Dictionary in 2021: 

 Xennial, n. and adj.: “A person born between the late 1970s and early 1980s, after (or towards the end of) Generation X and before (or at the beginning of) the millennial”

Terminology and birth year definitions
Xennials is a portmanteau blending the words Generation X and Millennials to describe a "micro-generation" or "cross-over generation" of people whose birth years are between the late 1970s and the early 1980s.

Xennials was coined by writer Sarah Stankorb, and discussed in a two-part, September 2014 article in GOOD magazine written by Stankorb, a freelance writer, and then-GOOD Magazine staff writer Jed Oelbaum. Good magazine has described Xennials as "a micro-generation that serves as a bridge between the disaffection of Gen X and the blithe optimism of Millennials." Dan Woodman, an Australian sociologist, was miscredited by the Australian media with inventing it, but clarified he did not in fact coin the term. Jed Oelbaum credits Sarah Stankorb with the term. The earliest traced usage comes from the 2014 Good article, which Stankorb pitched including the term Xennial. In 2017, Xennial was included in Merriam-Webster's "Words We're Watching" section, which discusses new words which are increasingly being used, but which do not yet meet criteria for a dictionary entry. Merriam-Webster Dictionary credited Stankorb with coining the term. In 2020, xennial was included in the Oxford Dictionary of English. The definition given is "a member of an age group born after Generation X and before the millennial generation (specifically in the late 1970s and early 1980s)". Xennials received additional attention in June 2017 following a viral Facebook post by Mashable.

In 2017 The Guardian noted, "In internet folklore, xennials are those born between 1977 and 1983, the release years of the original three Star Wars films." In 2018, Business Insider described Xennials as people who don't feel like a Generation Xer or a Millennial, using birth dates between 1977 and 1985. 

Other terms, such as the Oregon Trail Generation and Generation Catalano have been proposed. Doree Shafrir, writing for Slate magazine, chose "Generation Catalano" for its reference to the character Jordan Catalano, played by Jared Leto (b. 1971), from the 1994-95 teen drama My So-Called Life. She defined "Generation Catalano" as those born from 1977 to 1981, the timeframe of Jimmy Carter's presidency.

Characteristics and traits
Many people who were born during the cusp years of Generation X and the Millennial Generation do not fit the mold of those generations but rather share the characteristics of both.

The Generation X and Millennial demographic cohorts have been studied concerning generational differences in the workplace.  Researchers out of Eindhoven University of Technology found that not every person that belongs to a major generation will share all the same characteristics that are representative for that generation. People that are born on the cusp of a birth cohort may have overlapping characteristics that are related to both.  This concept is called “generational fuzziness,” and can lead to the formation of a “microgeneration.”  Researcher Melissa Kempf Taylor of the University of Louisville has written that the current microgeneration in the workforce is the Xennial generation, who have their own collective personality.  “In generational theory, a cusp is the group of individuals who fall into the overlap between two generations.”  “This overlap creates a cusp generation” which bridges the divide between “major generations.”

In 2004, Cynthia Cheng wrote a piece for the Toronto Star entitled "My So-Called Generation," where she referred to the cohort as "Bridges."

Marleen Stollen and Gisela Wolf of Business Insider Germany wrote that Xennials "had to bridge the divide between an analog childhood and digital adulthood." They are described as the youngest digital immigrants.

Cassie McClure, writing for Las Cruces Sun-News, described those in the Oregon Trail Generation as "remembering a time before the digital age, but barely". Anna Garvey has described these individuals as having "both a healthy portion of Gen X grunge cynicism, and a dash of the unbridled optimism of Millennials", and discusses their relationship with both analog and digital technology. Sheknows.com has described individuals born in the late 1970s and early 1980s as sharing traits with both Generation X and Millennials.

Anna Garvey characterized U.S members of this group as having had an "AOL adolescence" and as being from "the last gasp of a time before sexting, Facebook shaming, and constant communication".  Dustin Monke of The Dickinson Press described those born in the early 1980s as having early adulthoods which were impacted by the events of the September 11 attacks and the Iraq War. Sarah Stankorb has also pointed out that most Xennials were already on the job market when the Great Recession hit. 

"There are common experiences," explains Almudena Moreno, sociologist at the University of Valladolid and co-author of the Youth Report in Spain 2012, "and one of the differences between generations can be access to technological instruments, which provide a common living context." This context also influences how we relate to others.  According to Australian sociologist, Dan Woodman, "The theory goes that the Xennials dated, and often formed ongoing relationships, pre-social media. They usually weren't on Tinder or Grindr, for their first go at dating at least. They called up their friends and the person they wanted to ask out on a landline phone, hoping that it wasn't their intended date's parent who picked up." Woodman has referred to Xennials as a "cross-over generation" crediting this concept to journalists writing about individuals born during the cusp years, saying that this idea sounds plausible with respect to generations because "the divisions we use aren’t particularly robust. They tend to be imported from North America without much thought, built arbitrarily around the Boomers, and capture changes that often don’t have clear inflection points, so dates can vary."  Although he warns that an entire cohort of people will not have one set of characteristics or experiences.  Woodman also says, "Clearly the idea resonates with a lot of people who felt left out by the usual categorizations."  This does not mean that these terms have no value. As Woodman explains, paraphrasing philosopher José Ortega y Gasset, "we are formed by the time in which we live," especially by the experiences of our youth, "which determine our lives and can create new political movements."

See also 

 List of generations
 Generation Jones
 MTV Generation
 Zillennials
 Interbellum Generation

2014 neologisms

References

Cultural generations
Demographics of the United States
2010s neologisms